Mirage is the eighth album by Klaus Schulze. It was originally released in 1977, and in 2005, was the first Schulze album reissued by Revisited Records. A slightly different version of "Velvet Voyage" is included on the reissue. An excerpt from "In cosa crede chi non crede?", the bonus track on the reissue, was previously released on Trailer (1999), a compilation CD released to promote the release of Schulze's 50-disc CD box set The Ultimate Edition (2000). In 2017, a newly remastered 40th Anniversary Edition was released.

Track listing
All tracks composed by Klaus Schulze.

Personnel
 Klaus Schulze – electronics

References

External links
 Mirage at the official site of Klaus Schulze
 

Klaus Schulze albums
1977 albums